The 3rd Secretariat of the Workers' Party of Vietnam (WPV), formally the 3rd Secretariat of the Central Committee of the Workers' Party of Vietnam (Vietnamese: Ban Bí thư Ban Chấp hành Trung ương Đảng Lao động Việt Nam Khoá III), was elected by the 1st Plenary Session of the 3rd  Central Committee (CC) in the immediate aftermath of the 3rd National Congress.

Members

References

Bibliography
 

3rd Secretariat of the Workers' Party of Vietnam